Port Pirie was an electoral district of the House of Assembly in the Australian state of South Australia from 1915 to 1970.

Port Pirie was abolished after a boundary redistribution in 1970 when the Electoral district of Pirie was created.  The last member for Port Pirie, David McKee transferred to Pirie.

The town of Port Pirie is currently located in the seat of Frome.

Members

Election results

References 

Former electoral districts of South Australia
1915 establishments in Australia
1970 disestablishments in Australia
Port Pirie